The Mission Buenaventura class was a series of oilers in World War II in service with the United States Navy. Each of the ships was named after a mission or settlement along the El Camino Real in California, the sole exception being Mission Loreto, named for a settlement in Baja California Sur. When Mission Santa Ynez was scrapped in 2010 she was the last of the over 500 T2 tankers built during the war.

Ships
  (T-AO-111)
  (T-AO-112)
  (T-AO-113) 
 Mission De Pala (T-AO-114)
   (T-AO-115) 
   (T-AO-116)
   (T-AO-117)
   (T-AO-118)
   (T-AO-119)
  (T-AO-120)
  (T-AO-121)
  (T-AO-122)
  (T-AO-123)
  (T-AO-124)
  (T-AO-125)
  (T-AO-126)
  (T-AO-127)
  (T-AO-128)
  (T-AO-129)
  (T-AO-130)
  (T-AO-131)
  (T-AO-132)
  (T-AO-133)
  (T-AO-134)
  (T-AO-135)
  (T-AO-136)
  (T-AO-137)

 
Auxiliary ship classes of the United States Navy
Ships built in the San Francisco Bay Area